John Evan de Courcy Ireland (19 October 1911 – 4 April 2006) was an Irish maritime historian and political activist.

Biography
de Courcy Ireland was born at Lucknow, India, son of British Army major de Courcy Ireland and Gabrielle (née Byron). His father, a County Kildare native from an Irish landed gentry family, was stationed at Lucknow at the time of his son's birth. de Courcy Ireland was educated at Marlborough College, Oxford University and Trinity College Dublin, where he was awarded a PhD in 1951. The title of his thesis was "The Influence of the Sea on Civilisation".

In 1949 de Courcy Ireland taught at St Patrick's Cathedral School in Dublin. He moved in 1951 to Drogheda Grammar School and subsequently taught at Bandon Grammar School, Co Cork, and from 1968 at Kingstown Grammar School, Dún Laoghaire. This was amalgamated with Avoca School, Blackrock, to become Avoca Kingsown school, this later became Newpark Comprehensive School, south of Dublin, where he stayed until 1986, when he left teaching at the age of 75.

He and his wife, Betty, who had been a nurse in Barcelona during the Spanish Civil War, were affiliated with The Irish Anti-Apartheid Movement and was president of the Ireland-China Friendship Society. A committed socialist, he was also affiliated or involved with the Northern Ireland Labour Party, the Irish Labour Party, the Communist Party of Ireland, the Democratic Socialist Party, the Workers' Party, Democratic Left and latterly the Socialist Workers Party. He was James Larkin's election agent. He was a founding member of the Irish Campaign for Nuclear Disarmament.

In the 1980s, he twice stood for election as a Democratic Socialist Party candidate.  He unsuccessfully contested the Dún Laoghaire constituency at the November 1982 general election, and was unsuccessful again at the 1984 European Parliament election when he stood in the Dublin constituency.

Family
In 1933 he married Beatrice Haigh; they had one son and two daughters. After marrying the couple spent time in the Aran Islands and County Donegal to master the Irish language. Betty was also a noted political campaigner.

Death
John de Courcy Ireland died in 2006, aged 94.
A plaque in his memory was erected in Dalkey. It reads:
To the memory of Dr John DeCourcy Ireland 1911–2006
Maritime Historian, Radical Politician, Humanist, 
Teacher and Linguist. Founder Member of C.N.D. in Ireland.
Honours received from Argentina, Britain, China, 
France, Portugal, Spain, Yugoslavia, R.N.L.I.
A true friend of seafarers

Awards
John de Courcy Ireland had been a Council member of the Maritime Institute of Ireland, who operate the National Maritime Museum of Ireland, for 55 years and was its Honorary Research Officer. He was awarded the following:

 Portuguese Order of Prince Henry
 Order of the Yugoslav Flag
 Order of Spanish Naval Merit
 Order des Palmes Acadamiques of France
 Member of Marine Academies of France
 Member of Marine Academies of Portugal
 Caird Medal of the British National Maritime Museum
 Member of Instituto Browniano (Argentina)
 Centenary Medal of Almirante Brown (Argentina)
 Hon. Life Governor of the Royal National Lifeboat Institution

The Award he valued most was the plaque in the Peoples' Park, Dún Laoghaire, as it was the only award that coupled his name with that of his wife, Betty. The Maritime Institute of Ireland, posthumously awarded him its gold medal; it was accepted by his daughter on his behalf.

Publications
 History of Dun Laoghaire Harbour, John De Courcy Ireland – 2001, 
 Lifeboats in Dublin Bay, a review of the service from 1803–1997, John De Courcy Ireland – 1997, 
 The Sea and the Easter Rising. John De Courcy Ireland –  1996 (first version), /
 Ireland's maritime heritage, John De Courcy Ireland – 1992, 
 Ireland and the Irish in Maritime History, John De Courcy Ireland – 1985, 
 Wreck and Rescue on the East Coast of Ireland, John De Courcy Ireland – 1983, 
 Ireland's Sea Fisheries: A History, John De Courcy Ireland – 1981,

External links
John de Courcy Ireland collection at UCD
Maritime Historical Studies Centre, University of Hull FAR
Re Karl Spindler (in German)
Bibliography
Obituary by Rory Clarke, friend and former pupil of "Doc Ireland", also published in The Eyes 2006
"Tributes are paid to..." by Lorna Siggins, Irish Times, 6 April 2006

References

1911 births
2006 deaths
Alumni of the University of Oxford
Irish maritime historians
Irish non-fiction writers
Irish male non-fiction writers
Irish schoolteachers
Irish socialists
Irish Trotskyists
People educated at Marlborough College
Democratic Socialist Party (Ireland) politicians
Alumni of Trinity College Dublin
People from Dún Laoghaire
20th-century non-fiction writers
British people in colonial India